Nowy Patok  is a village in the administrative district of Gmina Krzywda, within Łuków County, Lublin Voivodeship, in eastern Poland. It is around 80 km south east of Warsaw.

References

Nowy Patok